E6 series may refer to:

E6 series (preferred numbers), a series of standardized resistor and capacitor values
E6 series (train), a Japanese Shinkansen train since 1997

See also
E6 (disambiguation)